Rhodokrambe laingioides is a species of Antarctic marine red alga.

References

Further reading
Amsler, Charles D., and Suzanne Fredericq. "Max H. Hommersand, Richard L. Moe." Biology of Polar Benthic Algae (2011): 53.

External links
AlgaeBase

Delesseriaceae
Species described in 2009